News Bites is a now defunct minute news break of Studio 23 developed by ABS-CBN Corporation via ABS-CBN News and Current Affairs featuring local and international news from 1999 to 2010. A rundown of the things from technology, sports and entertainment is covered by the show.

"Newsbite or news-bite" is a new concept and as J. Knox says in his article, it is referred  to the evolution of verbal news genres in online newspapers. A home page is the entry point of an online newspaper, into a home page we can find different elements; one of these, specifically one of the central visual-verbal element is a newsbite. As it is said before, the newsbite, is considered a relatively new news genre, particularly talking about news stories. The newsbite is the result of the evolution of technological and social developments in the online newspapers field. In that sense, newsbites can be considered as a pinch of information written in a particular way. The newsbite concept is different from newsbrief, because the first one functions as an independent text. Its functionality is to highlight important stories of the online newspaper, and as the author says: "Their social purpose is to present the focal point of a news story with immediacy and impact".

See also
List of programs aired by Studio 23
ABS-CBN News and Current Affairs
Studio 23
Bilis Balita
Iba-Balita
Iba-Balita Ngayon

External links
 http://www.studio23.tv
 http://www.news-bite.com

Studio 23 news shows
1999 Philippine television series debuts
2010 Philippine television series endings
English-language television shows